The Department of Northern Development was an Australian government department that existed between December 1972 and June 1975.

History
The Department of Northern Development was established in December 1972 charged with overall  policy and co-ordination in Australia's development north of the 26th parallel. The Government appointed Ray Livingston, formerly a Deputy Secretary at the Department of Trade and Industry, Secretary of the Department in the days after its formal establishment.

In June 1975, the Department was replaced by the Department of Northern Australia which was an amalgamation of the Northern Development Department and the Department of the Northern Territory.

Scope
Information about the department's functions and/or government funding allocation could be found in the Administrative Arrangements Orders, the annual Portfolio Budget Statements and in the Department's annual reports.

At its creation, the Department was responsible for the following:
In respect of the part of Australia north of the parallel 26 degrees south latitude:
Matters related to the specialised development and utilisation of    natural resources, being land, water and minerals 
Matters related to the production and marketing of sugar and beef, and the production, processing and export of minerals 
Specialised transport development projects, including beef and development roads, mining railways and mineral port facilities 
In relation to the foregoing- 
The undertaking or support of research 
The planning or initiation of projects 
The co-ordination of activities in respect of projects 
Co-operation with the States and other authorities

Structure
The Department was a Commonwealth Public Service department, staffed by officials who were responsible to the Minister for Northern Development, Rex Patterson.

References

Australia, Northern Development
Northern Development